Dorita Ferreyro (March 31, 1916 – December 7, 2011) was an Argentine film actress. She is also often credited as Dora Ferreiro. Ferreyro appeared in more than fifty films and television programmes during her career as well as theatre and radio work.

Filmography 

1936: Santos Vega
1937: Melgarejo
1939: Mi suegra es una fiera
1939: Gold in Clay
1939: La mujer y el jockey (Hipódromo)
1942: The Gaucho War
1948: Juan Moreira
1953: Las tres claves
1955: Para vestir santos
1956: Los torturados
1957: Alfonsina
1958: l festín de Satanás
1961: La sed
1967: Mujeres en presidio (TV Series, 19 episodes)
1967: Lo mejor de nuestra vida... nuestros hijos (TV Series, 39 episodes)
1968: Adorable profesor Aldao (TV Series, 29 episodes)
1969: Cuando vuelvas a mí (TV Series, 19 episodes)
1968-1970: Su comedia favorita (TV Series, 3 episodes)
1970: Inconquistable Viviana Hortiguera (TV Series,,29 episodes)
1970: Esta noche... miedo (TV Series, 2 episodes)
1970: El hombre que me negaron (TV Series, 19 episodes)
1971: Nacido para odiarte (TV Series, 39 episodes)
1970-1971: El teleteatro de Alberto Migré (TV Series, 3 episodes)
1971: Cuatro hombres para Eva (TV Series, 29 episodes)
Un extraño en nuestras vidas (TV Series, 22 episodes)
1972: Mariano Marzán, un médico de Buenos Aires (TV Series, 9 episodes)
1972: Rolando Rivas, taxista (TV Series)
1973: Albina
1973: Teatro como en el teatro (TV Series, 2 episodes)
1973: Pobre diabla (TV Series, 59 episodes)
1973: Lo mejor de nuestra vida... nuestros hijos (TV Series, 19 episodes)
1973: Gorosito y señora (TV Series, 19 episodes)
1974: Todos nosotros (TV Series, 19 episodes)
1974: Mi hombre sin noche (TV Series, 19 episodes)
1974: Humor a la italiana (TV Series, 1 episode)
1974: Enséñame a quererte (TV Series, 36 episodes)
1974: Con odio y con amor (TV Series, 29 episodes)
1974: La Mary
1975: Tu rebelde ternura (TV Series, 74 episodes)
1975: Alguien por quien vivir (TV Series, 19 episodes)
1975: A Woman
1976: Los que estamos solos (TV Series, 19 episodes)
1976: Dos a quererse (TV Series, 19 episodes)
1977: Para todos (TV Series, 19 episodes)
1977: Pablo en nuestra piel (TV Series, 19 episodes)
1977: El tema es el amor (TV Series, 19 episodes)
1978: Vos y yo, toda la vida (TV Series, 19 episodes)
1979: Chau, amor mío (TV Series, 20 episodes)
1980: Fabián 2 Mariana (TV Series, 19 episodes)
1981: Quiero gritar tu nombre (TV Series, 195 episodes)
1981: Aprender a vivir (TV Series, 3 episodes)
1982: Un hombre como vos (TV Series, 19 episodes)
1981-1982: Teatro de humor (TV Series, 3 episodes)
1982: Nosotros y los miedos (TV Series, 1 episode)
1983: Solab (TV Series, 29 episodes)
1984: Tal como somos (TV Series, 125 episodes)
1985: Libertad condicionada (TV Series, 284 episodes)
1987: La cuñada (TV Series, 264 episodes)
1988: Vendedoras de Lafayette (TV Series, 29 episodes)
1990: La bonita página (TV Series, 1 episode)
1991: Alta comedia (TV Series)
1992: La elegida (TV Series, 29 episodes)
1994: Para toda la vida (TV Series, 19 episodes)
1995: Leandro Leiva, un soñador (TV Series, 20 episodes)
1996: Son cosas de novela (TV Series, 19 episodes)
1997: Rich and Famous (TV Series, 4 episodes)

References

Bibliography 
 Abel Posadas, Mónica Landro, Marta Speroni. Cine sonoro argentino: 1933-1943. El Calafate Editores, 2005.

External links 
 

1916 births
2011 deaths
20th-century Argentine actresses
Argentine film actresses
People from Buenos Aires